Major General William Spottiswoode Trevor VC (9 October 1831 – 2 November 1907) was a recipient of the Victoria Cross (VC), the highest and most prestigious award for gallantry in the face of the enemy that can be awarded to British and Commonwealth forces.

Details
Trevor was the son of Robert Salusbury Trevor and Mary Spottiswoode. His father, a captain with the 3rd Bengal Cavalry, was murdered in Kabul during the First Anglo-Afghan War, at the time of the assassination of the British Envoy, Sir William Macnaghten. Trevor, along with his mother and siblings, had accompanied his father to Afghanistan and were amongst the hostages held by the Afghans following the 1842 retreat from Kabul. They were rescued following General Pollock's reoccupation of Kabul in 1842. A younger brother was Sir Arthur Trevor.

Educated at Edinburgh Academy and Addiscombe Military Seminary, Trevor was commissioned second lieutenant in the Bengal Engineers in December 1849. After further training, he arrived in India in 1852 and took part in the Second Anglo-Burmese War, where he was twice wounded and mentioned in dispatches. After undertaking survey work in Burma, he transferred to Bengal in October 1857, where he served during the Indian Mutiny. Promoted captain in August 1858, he was then involved in engineering projects in Bengal.

In February 1865 Trevor joined the Bhutan field force as field engineer. He was a 33 years old major in the Bengal Engineers, Bengal Army during the Bhutan War when the following deed took place on 30 April 1865 at Dewan-Giri, Bhutan for which he was awarded the VC in a joint citation with Lieutenant James Dundas:

After recovering from his wounds, Trevor became superintending engineer at the Bengal Presidency, and was made brevet major in May 1866. Promoted lieutenant-colonel in August 1874, he held a number of engineering roles in India, and in December 1875 was appointed chief engineer of British Burma, a post he held for five years. He was promoted brevet colonel on 19 August 1879, and in 1880 became director-general of Railways. He then served as secretary to the government of India in the Public Works Department from February 1882 until his retirement from the army in February 1887, with the honorary rank of major-general.

Trevor married Eliza Ann Fisher, daughter of the Reverend Henry Sanderson Fisher of the Indian Ecclesiastical Service at St Andrews Church Darjeeling, in a ceremony conducted by the bride's father, on 19 June 1858. Before Eliza died in 1863, the marriage produced 3 daughters: Mildred Charlotte Mary Trevor (1859–1860); Lylee Grace Trevor (1860–1878) and Florence Mary Trevor (1862–1934), who later married Colonel Maule Campbell Brackenbury.

Trevor died on 2 November 1907 aged 76 at his home in Westminster, London, and is buried at Kensal Green Cemetery.

His Victoria Cross is displayed at the Royal Engineers Museum, Gillingham, Kent.

References

Monuments to Courage (David Harvey, 1999)
The Register of the Victoria Cross (This England, 1997)
The Sapper VCs (Gerald Napier, 1998)
Scotland's Forgotten Valour (Graham Ross, 1995)

External links
Indian railways: winners of the Victoria Cross
Royal Engineers Museum Sappers VCs
Location of grave and VC medal (Kensal Green Cemetery)

1831 births
1907 deaths
Military personnel of British India
People educated at Edinburgh Academy
Graduates of Addiscombe Military Seminary
British recipients of the Victoria Cross
Burials at Kensal Green Cemetery
British military personnel of the Bhutan War
British Army personnel of the Second Anglo-Burmese War
British Indian Army generals
Royal Engineers officers
Bengal Engineers officers
British military personnel of the Indian Rebellion of 1857
Railway officers in British India